Transcending Fear: The Story of Gao Zhisheng is a 2013 biography documentary film covering the life of Chinese human rights lawyer Gao Zhisheng. The film was directed by Wenjing Ma.

References

External links
 
 

2013 films